"What a Time" is a song by American singer Julia Michaels featuring Irish singer Niall Horan, from her fourth EP, Inner Monologue Part 1 (2019). The song was written by Michaels, Justin Tranter, Casey Barth, and Riley Knapp, and produced by Ian Kirkpatrick and RKCB. It was sent to Australian radio on March 29, 2019, as the second single from the EP and was the second most added song days after its release. It was nominated at the Teen Choice Awards 2019 for Choice  Collaboration.

Composition
"What a Time" has been described as a slow pop song. Lyrically, "What a Time" has been referred to as "mourn[ing] the end of a relationship". The chorus, which contains the lyrics "I think of that night in the park, it was getting dark / And we stayed up for hours / What a time, what a time, what a time," has been described by MTV as "powerful".

Live performances 
On February 18, 2019, Michaels and Horan performed the song for the first time on The Late Late Show with James Corden. On January 15, 2020, Michaels performed a solo version of the song at the House of Blues Chicago on the Honda Stage.

Music video
The music video was released on February 7, 2019, and was directed by Boni Mata. The video features the singer and a look-alike of Horan in a flower-strewn apartment where the two reminisce about past relationships. An acoustic video was released on March 28, 2019.

Accolades

Charts

Certifications

Release history

References

2018 songs
2019 singles
Julia Michaels songs
Niall Horan songs
Songs written by Julia Michaels
Songs written by Justin Tranter
Male–female vocal duets